Beaulieu Convent School is a Roman Catholic independent school for girls located in St Helier, Jersey.

The school was established in 1951 by sisters from the Order of the Immaculate Conception. In 1999 the Order of the Immaculate Conception gifted Beaulieu School, the site and its buildings to the island of Jersey on the understanding it would remain a Catholic School.

Today the school is divided into preschool, primary and secondary departments, and also operates a sixth form. Courses of study offered at the school include GCSEs, A Levels and BTECs.

See also
Catholic Church in Jersey
List of schools in Jersey

References

External links
Beaulieu Convent School official website

Schools in Jersey
Catholic Church in Jersey
Saint Helier
Jersey
Educational institutions established in 1951
Girls' schools in Jersey
Secondary schools in the Channel Islands
Sixth form colleges in British Overseas Territories and Crown Dependencies
1951 establishments in the British Empire
Roman Catholic private schools in the Diocese of Portsmouth